Warwick County was a county in Southeast Virginia that was created from Warwick River Shire, one of eight created in the Virginia Colony in 1634. It became the City of Newport News on July 16, 1952. Located on the Virginia Peninsula on the northern bank of the James River between Hampton Roads and Jamestown, the area consisted primarily of farms and small unincorporated villages until the arrival of the Peninsula Extension of the Chesapeake and Ohio Railway in 1881 and development led by industrialist  Collis P. Huntington.

With the railroad came the coal piers, several local stations in Warwick County for passenger service and shipping produce and seafood to markets, and a branch link to the resorts and military facilities in neighboring Elizabeth City County at Old Point Comfort. The community at the southeastern edge on the harbor of Hampton Roads became Newport News in 1896, hosting the world's largest shipyard.

At the outset of World War I, the U.S. Army facility which became Fort Eustis was established in the county. After the war, Camp Patrick Henry, a former military facility, became the site of Newport News/Williamsburg International Airport. After sparring over annexations and exploring various plans to refine and/or combine local governments, by mutual agreement, after existing for over 325 years, the City of Warwick  was politically consolidated with the younger city of Newport News on July 1, 1958. The better known name of "Newport News" was assumed for the combined entity, forming one of the contemporary cities of Hampton Roads.

Colonial period
During the 17th century, shortly after establishment of the settlement at Jamestown in 1607, English settlers explored and began settling the areas adjacent to Hampton Roads. By 1634, the English colony of Virginia consisted of eight shires or counties with a total population of approximately 5,000 inhabitants.

Warwick River Shire took its name from Robert Rich, second Earl of Warwick and a prominent member of the Virginia Company who was proprietor of Richneck Plantation. Warwick River Shire became Warwick County in 1643.

The first courthouse and jail were located at Warwick Towne, established in 1680.

American Revolutionary War
Warwick County became an important site for shipbuilding during the American Revolutionary War. During the inaugural session of the Virginia General Assembly, the senate began acquiring lands for naval manufacturing. Charles O. Paullin states that "no other state owned as much land, properties, and manufactories devoted to naval purposes as Virginia. Sampson Mathews from nearby Augusta County oversaw the operation stationed at Warwick, the most important of Virginia's ship works.

Statehood, 19th century
Warwick County recorded 1,690 persons in the federal census of 1790, making it the third smallest county population-wise in Virginia.  In 1809, Warwick Towne was abandoned, and the county seat was moved to the area of Denbigh Plantation, near Stoney Run.

The new county seat was at Denbigh, where in 1810 Warwick's first brick courthouse was built. It also served as clerk's office and jail. In 1884, a large courthouse was erected on the same tract, the clerk retaining the old building. Both served until the merger with the city of Newport News in 1958.

C&O brings railroad transportation, development of a new city
Immediately after the end of the American Civil War in 1865, land agents began acquiring land in Warwick County for Collis P. Huntington, the railroad magnate, for "future enterprise". On the basis of these land purchases, the original city of Newport News was to be built at the southern end of the county. In 1880, Huntington formed the Old Dominion Land Company, to which he turned over his holdings. The following year, in 1881, it was announced that Newport News had been chosen as the Atlantic deep water terminus of the Chesapeake and Ohio Railway (C&O). Construction work on the C&O's Peninsula Extension began at Newport News Point in December 1880. A second crew began building east from Richmond in February 1881.

The C&O provided the promised transportation by rail to the Yorktown Centennial on October 19. During the next few years, Huntington developed the southeastern area of the county extensively, notably building the new Hotel Warwick. In 1886, Huntington established Newport News Shipbuilding and Drydock Company.

The boom community of Newport News became an independent city in 1896 by an act of the Virginia General Assembly, one of the few cities in Virginia to have never been incorporated as a town and it became Virginia's third largest city in population at one time.

20th-century military facilities
In 1918, Warwick County became the site of the military installation, Camp Abraham Eustis, later renamed Fort Eustis. The U.S. Army base, hastily constructed during World War I near the mouth of the Warwick River, included Mulberry Island. Lee Hall, Virginia was the closest railroad station and handled a large volume of troop traffic, especially during World War II when Camp Patrick Henry was established nearby. Camp Patrick Henry served primarily as a troop staging ground during World War II under the control of the Hampton Roads Port of Embarkation.  The camp, founded in late 1942, was an approximately  complex, built in largely virgin forest. At its peak, Camp Patrick Henry had a capacity of approximately 35,000. After World War II, it closed and the land was redeveloped as a commercial airport, now known as Newport News/Williamsburg International Airport.

Historical Population

Politics

See also 
Warwick, Virginia
Newport News, Virginia
Warwick County Courthouses
List of former United States counties
Former counties, cities, and towns of Virginia

References

External links
Chronological History of Warwick County Virginia
Library of Virginia - Warwick River County

Former counties of Virginia
Geography of Newport News, Virginia
History of Newport News, Virginia